The Rutan Farm is a historic  farm located on Mattison Avenue north of Branchville in Frankford Township of Sussex County, New Jersey. Listed as the Log Cabin and Farm, it was added to the National Register of Historic Places on August 24, 1977, for its significance in architecture. It includes two contributing buildings, the Rutan Log Cabin and a barn.

History and description
The farm is located on the south slope of Kittatinny Mountain and borders Stokes State Forest. The listing estimates it predates the end of the 18th century. The Rutan Log Cabin consists of two sections, each constructed with hewn logs and notched with half-dovetail joints at the corners. The gable roofs are covered with wood shingles. In 1989, the cabin was relocated to Waterloo Village to save it from demolition. It is a contributing property of that historic district.

See also
 National Register of Historic Places listings in Sussex County, New Jersey

References

External links
 

Frankford Township, New Jersey	
National Register of Historic Places in Sussex County, New Jersey
Historic districts on the National Register of Historic Places in New Jersey
Farms on the National Register of Historic Places in New Jersey
New Jersey Register of Historic Places